{{Infobox election
| election_name = 2021 North Northamptonshire Council election
| type = Parliamentary
| ongoing = no
| election_date = 6 May 2021
| party1 = Conservative Party (UK)
| seats1 = 60
| popular_vote1 = 124,537
| percentage1 = 53.2%
| party2 = Labour Party (UK)
| seats2 = 14
| popular_vote2 = 69,258
| percentage2 = 29.6%
| party3 = Green Party of England and Wales
| seats3 = 3
| popular_vote3 = 16,701
| percentage3 = 7.1%| party4 = Independent (politician)
| seats4 = 1
| popular_vote4 = 6,196
| percentage4 = 2.6%
| party5 = Liberal Democrats (UK)
| seats5 = 0
| popular_vote5 = 16,348
| percentage5 = 7.0%
| party6 = Reform UK
| seats6 = 0
| popular_vote6 = 498
| percentage6 = 0.2%
| party7 = Alliance for Democracy and Freedom
| seats7 = 0
| popular_vote7 = 100
| percentage7 = 0.04%
| party_colour = yes
| posttitle = Council control after election
| seats_for_election = 78 seats on North Northamptonshire Council

}}

The 2021 North Northamptonshire Council election''' took place alongside nationwide local elections. The election was originally due to take place in May 2020, but was postponed due to the COVID-19 pandemic.

It was the inaugural election for the unitary authority, which was created one month before in April 2021, after the merger of the four existing non-metropolitan districts of Corby, East Northamptonshire, Kettering, and Wellingborough. North Northamptonshire absorbed the functions of these districts, plus those of the abolished Northamptonshire County Council. All 26 wards elect 3 councillors each, resulting in 78 councillors being elected and 40 seats being required for a majority.

Results by Division

Corby

East Northamptonshire

Kettering

Wellingborough

By-elections

Oundle
A by-election was held to fill the seat vacated by Cllr Annabel de Capell Brooke.

Northall
A by-election will be held on Thursday 2nd February 2023 due to the death of Cllr Kevin Thurland.

Rushden South
A by-election will be held in 2023 due to the death of Cllr David Jenney.

References

Council elections in Northamptonshire
North Northamptonshire
North Northamptonshire